Grevillea meisneri is a shrub in the family Proteacae. It is endemic to New Caledonia. It is a manganese accumulator.

The species name honors botanist Carl Meissner.

Description

References

meisneri
Endemic flora of New Caledonia